The Ictaluridae, sometimes  called ictalurids, are a family of catfish native to North America, where they are an important food source and sometimes fished for sport. The family includes about 51 species, some commonly known as bullheads, madtoms, channel catfish, and blue catfish.

Taxonomy
The family Ictaluridae is strongly supported as a monophyletic group. It is closely related to the Asian family Cranoglanididae. These two families are sister taxa in the superfamily Ictaluroidea.

Though the family includes three genera of blind, subterranean, and troglobitic catfishes, Trogloglanis, Satan, and Prietella, none of these three genera is closely related. Instead, Satan is closely related to Pylodictis, Prietella to Noturus, and Trogloglanis possibly to Ictalurus, although it may not be closely related to any of the other ictalurids. Ameiurus is sister to a clade formed by Satan, Pylodictis, Noturus, and Prietella.

Distribution and habitat
Ictalurids originate from North America from southern Canada to Guatemala. Both bullheads and madtoms tend to be found in small streams and ponds, but are also known in larger bodies of water. Channel catfish, bullheads, and madtoms are "bottom feeders" with widely varied diets that include scavenging.

Notable species
Blue catfish Ictalurus furcatus
Tadpole madtom
Brown bullhead
Yellow bullhead
Black bullhead
Channel catfish
Widemouth blindcat

Description
Ictalurid species have four pairs of barbels (commonly referred to as "whiskers" as applied to catfish). Their skin does not have any scales. The dorsal and pectoral fins usually possess a spine. The dorsal fin usually has six soft rays. The palate is toothless except in the fossil genus Astephus. The genera Trogoglanis, Satan, and Prietella include four species of blind catfishes. They have the ability to inflict painful stings with venomous spines embedded in their fins.

The bullheads, though, are small catfish which at maturity often weigh less than 0.5 kg (1 lb), while the madtoms (genus Noturus) are in general much smaller.

Relationship to humans
The North American catfish has acquired an association with American Southern folklore which exceeds its place as a mere food fish. The image of cane-pole fishing for catfish at a proverbial lazy stream has become a stand-by of southern Americana. 

In some areas, the bullhead is seen as a desirable quarry, for its fighting qualities exceed its size. In other areas, it is seen as a nuisance fish due to its efficient bait-stealing qualities.

References

External links
 
 

 
Freshwater fish of North America
Catfish families
Taxa named by Theodore Gill